A road movie is a cinematic genre in which the action takes places during a road journey.

Road movie may also refer to:

Films and video
 Road to …, comedy film series starring Bob Hope, Bing Crosby, and Dorothy Lamour
 Road Movie (film), 2002 South Korean remake of the 1974 film
 Road Movie (1974 film), American film by Joseph Strick
 Road, Movie, 2010 Hindi film, directed by Dev Benegal and starring Abhay Deol
 Road Movie (video), 1996 documentary-style film by rock group R.E.M.
Road Trip, 2000 film by Todd Phillips and starring Breckin Meyer

Music
 "Road Movies" (John Adams), 1995 composition by John Adams
 Road Movies (album), 2001 album by the group LAND
 "Road Movie", song by Asian Kung-Fu Generation